Snake Valley may refer to:

 Snake Valley, Victoria, Australia
 Snake Valley, Alberta, Canada
 Snake Valley (Musical Group)
 Snake Valley (Great Basin), a valley partially in Nevada and Utah, United States
 Snake Valley, South Africa